Masculism or masculinism may variously refer to ideologies and socio-political movements that seek to eliminate sexism against men, equalize their rights with women, and increase adherence to or promotion of attributes regarded as typical of men and boys. The terms may also refer to the men's rights movement or men's movement, as well as a type of antifeminism.

Terminology

Early history
According to the historian Judith Allen, Charlotte Perkins Gilman invented the term masculism in 1914, when she gave a public lecture series in New York entitled "Studies in Masculism". Apparently the printer did not like the term and tried to change it. Allen writes that Gilman used masculism to refer to the opposition of misogynist men to women's rights and, more broadly, to describe "men's collective political and cultural actions on behalf of their own sex", or what Allen calls the "sexual politics of androcentric cultural discourses". Gilman referred to men and women who opposed women's suffrage as masculists—women who collaborated with these men were "Women Who Won't Move Forward"—and described World War I as "masculism at its worst".

In response to the lecture, W. H. Sampson wrote in a letter to the New York Times that women must share the blame for war: "It is perfectly useless to pretend that men have fought, struggled and labored for themselves, while women have stayed at home, wishing they wouldn't, praying before the shrines for peace, and using every atom of their influence to bring about a holy calm."

Definition and scope 
The Oxford English Dictionary (2000) defines masculinism, and synonymously masculism, as: "A male counterpart to feminism. Masculists reject the idea of universal patriarchy, arguing that before feminism most men were as disempowered as most women. However, in the post-feminist era they argue that men are in a worse position because of the emphasis on women's rights." According to Susan Whitlow in The Encyclopedia of Literary and Cultural Theory (2011), the terms are "used interchangeably across disciplines".  Sociologist Robert Menzies wrote in 2007 that both terms are common in men's rights and anti-feminist literature: "The intrepid virtual adventurer who boldly goes into these unabashedly mascul(in)ist spaces is quickly rewarded with a torrent of diatribes, invectives, atrocity tales, claims to entitlement, calls to arms, and prescriptions for change in the service of men, children, families, God, the past, the future, the nation, the planet, and all other things non-feminist."

The gender-studies scholar Julia Wood describes masculinism as an ideology asserting that women and men should have different roles and rights owing to fundamental differences between them, and that men suffer from discrimination and "need to reclaim their rightful status as men". Sociologists Arthur Brittan and Satoshi Ikeda describe masculinism as an ideology justifying male domination in society. Masculinism, according to Brittan, maintains that there is "a fundamental difference" between men and women and rejects feminist arguments that male–female relationships are political constructs.

According to Ferrel Christensen, a Canadian philosopher and president of the former Alberta-based Movement for the Establishment of Real Gender Equality, "Defining 'masculism' is made difficult by the fact that the term has been used by very few people, and by hardly any philosophers." He differentiates between "progressive masculists", who welcome many of the societal changes promoted by feminists, while believing that some measures to reduce sexism against women have increased it against men, and an "extremist version" of masculism that promotes male supremacy. He argued that if masculism and feminism refer to the belief that men/women are systematically discriminated against, and that this discrimination should be eliminated, there is not necessarily a conflict between feminism and masculism, and some assert that they are both. However, many believe that one sex is more discriminated against, and thus use one label and reject the other.

The political scientist Georgia Duerst-Lahti distinguishes between masculism, which expresses the ethos of the early gender-egalitarian men's movement, and masculinism, which refers to the ideology of patriarchy. Sociologists Melissa Blais and Francis Dupuis-Déri describe masculism as a form of antifeminism; they equate masculist and masculinist, attributing the former to author Warren Farrell. The most common term, they argue, is the "men's movement"; they write that there is a growing consensus in the French-language media that the movement should be referred to as masculiniste. According to Whitlow, masculinist theory such as Farrell's and that of gender-studies scholar R.W. Connell developed alongside third-wave feminism and queer theory, and was influenced by those theories' questioning of traditional gender roles and the meaning of terms such as man and woman.

According to Bethany M. Coston and Michael Kimmel, members of the mythopoetic men's movement identify as masculinist. Nicholas Davidson, in The Failure of Feminism (1988),  calls masculism "virism": "Where the feminist perspective is that social ills are caused by the dominance of masculine values, the virist perspective is that they are caused by a decline of those values. ..." Christensen calls virism "an extreme brand of masculism and masculinism".

Areas of interest

Education and employment

Many masculists oppose co-educational schooling, believing that single-sex schools better promote the well-being of boys.

Data from the U.S. in 1994 reported that men suffer 94% of workplace fatalities. Farrell has argued that men do a disproportionate share of dirty, physically demanding, and hazardous jobs.

Violence and suicide

Masculists cite higher rates of suicide in men than women. Farrell expresses concern about violence against men being depicted as humorous, in the media and elsewhere.

They also express concern about violence against men being ignored or minimized in comparison to violence against women, asserting gender symmetry in domestic violence. Another of Farrell's concerns is that traditional assumptions of female innocence or sympathy for women, termed benevolent sexism, do lead to unequal penalties for women and men who commit similar crimes, to lack of sympathy for male victims in domestic violence cases when the perpetrator is female, and to dismissal of female-on-male sexual assault and sexual harassment cases.

Gender studies 

A masculist approach to gender studies, which have frequently focused on woman-based or feminist approaches, examines oppression within a masculinist, patriarchal society from a male standpoint. According to Oxford Reference, "Masculinists reject the idea of universal patriarchy, arguing that before feminism most men were as disempowered as most women."

South African masculinist evangelical movements 
In the wake of the abolition of apartheid, South Africa saw a resurgence of masculinist Christian evangelical groups, led by the Mighty Men Conference (MMC) and the complementary Worthy Women Conference (WWC). The latter saw the development of what theologian Sarojini Nadar and psychologist Cheryl Potgeier call formenism: "Formenism, like masculinism, subscribes to a belief in the inherent superiority of men over women (in other words, only men can be leaders), but unlike masculinism, it is not an ideology developed and sustained by men, but one constructed, endorsed and sustained by women" [emphasis in original]. The Mighty Men movement harkens back to the Victorian idea of Muscular Christianity. Feminist scholars argue that the movement's lack of attention to women's rights and the struggle for racial equality makes it a threat to women and to the stability of the country. Scholar Miranda Pillay argues that the Mighty Men movement's appeal lies in its resistance to gender equality as incompatible with Christian values, and in raising patriarchy to a "hyper-normative status", beyond challenge by other claims to power.

The Worthy Women Conference is an auxiliary to the MMC in advocating a belief in the inherent superiority of men over women. Its leader, Gretha Wiid, blames South Africa's disorder on the liberation of women, and aims to restore the nation through its families, making women again subservient to men. Her success is attributed to her balancing claims that God created the gender hierarchy, but that women are no less valuable than men, and that restoration of traditional gender roles relieves existential anxiety in post-apartheid South Africa.

See also

 Identity politics
 Manosphere
 Men's liberation
 Men's movement
 Men's studies

Men's organizations
 International Men's Day (19 November)
Trinidad and Tobago, Jamaica, Australia, India, United States, Singapore, United Kingdom, Malta, South Africa, Hungary, Ireland, Ghana and Canada
 Save Indian Family
UK:
 Fathers 4 Justice
Canada:
 Canadian Association for Equality
France:
 SOS Papa
 Notable people associated with masculism
 Robert E. Bly

Explanatory notes

References

Further reading
  
 Myth of Male Power by Warren Farrell

External links 
 

 
Masculinity
Men's movement
1980s neologisms
Men's rights
Opposition to feminism
Political ideologies